Emil Hekele (born 31 March 1977) is a Czech cyclo-cross cyclist.

Major results
2006–2007
 2nd Grand Prix Axa
2017–2018
 1st Rapha Supercross Nobeyama Day 1
2018–2019
 1st Grand Prix Rakova
 2nd Grand Prix Garage Collé
 2nd Grand Prix Möbel Alvisse
 2nd Kansai Cyclo Cross Makino Round
 2nd Rapha Supercross Nobeyama
2019–2020
 1st  National Championships
 1st November Cross
 1st Kansai Cyclo Cross Makino Round
 1st Utsunomiya Cyclo Cross Day 1 & 2
 1st Rapha Supercross Nobeyama
 1st Tage des Querfeldeinsports
 2nd Grand Prix Rakova

Doping violation
On 6 January 2021, The Disciplinary Commission of the Czech Cycling Association imposed a four-year ban on cyclocrosser Emil Hekele.  The doping control performed out of competition on 9 September 2020 on Emil Hekele was a positive finding with the banned substances oxandrolone and clenbuterol (anabolic androgenic steroids).

References

External links

1977 births
Living people
People from Zábřeh
Cyclo-cross cyclists
Czech male cyclists
Sportspeople from the Olomouc Region